Louis Arthur Audette (1 December 1856 – 20 January 1942) was a Canadian lawyer and judge of the Exchequer Court of Canada.

Biography 
Born in Quebec City, Audette was educated at Quebec Seminary and Laval University. He was called to the Quebec Bar in 1880 and appointed King's Counsel in 1908.

Audette was the Registrar of the Exchequer Court of Canada from 1887, when it was detached from the Supreme Court of Canada, until 1912, when he was appointed Assistant Judge of the Exchequer Court, becoming a Pusine Judge in 1920. From 1913 to 1916, he chaired a commission of inquiry on pelagic sealing. 

Audette retired in December 1931, upon reaching the mandatory retirement age of seventy-five, and was replaced by Eugène-Réal Angers. He died in Ottawa in 1942, aged eighty-five.

His son Louis de la Chesnaye Audette was a lawyer, naval officer, and civil servant.

References 

 Ian Bushnell, The Federal Court of Canada: A History, 1875-1992. Toronto: University of Toronto Press, 1997.

1856 births
1942 deaths
People from Quebec City
Université Laval alumni
Judges of the Exchequer Court of Canada
Canadian King's Counsel
Lawyers in Quebec